Isaac Daniel Roosevelt (September 29, 1790 – December 24, 1863) was an American businessman and the paternal grandfather of U.S. President Franklin D. Roosevelt.

Early life
Isaac Daniel Roosevelt was born on September 29, 1790 in New York City, He was the son of businessman and politician James Roosevelt (1760–1847) and Maria Eliza Walton (1769–1810), the daughter of Admiral Gerard Walton (d. 1821) and a descendant of Wilhelmus Beekman, who was the treasurer of the Dutch West India Company, Mayor of New York City, Governor of Delaware from 1653 to 1664, and Governor of Pennsylvania from 1658 to 1663.

His paternal grandparents were merchant and politician Isaac Roosevelt (1726–1794), a New York State Assemblyman and the New York State Constitutional Convention, and Cornelia Hoffman. He was the 3x-great-grandson of the first Roosevelt in America, Claes Maartenszen Van Rosenvelt (d. 1659).

Personal life
In 1825, he married Mary Rebecca Aspinwall (1809–1886), daughter of John Aspinwall (1779–1847) and Susan Howland (1779–1852). They had two sons:
James Roosevelt I (1828–1900), who first married Rebecca Brien Howland (1831—1876). After her death, he married Sara Ann Delano (1854–1941)
John Aspinwall Roosevelt (1840–1909), who married Ellen M. Crosby (1837—1928), daughter of William Henry Crosby, on June 6, 1866.

He died on December 24, 1863, at the age of 73 in Hyde Park, New York.

Descendants

His eldest son, James Roosevelt I, was the father of diplomat James Roosevelt Roosevelt (1854–1927), with Howland, and President Franklin Delano Roosevelt (1882– 1945), with Delano. Younger son, John Aspinwall, was the father of tennis players Grace Walton Roosevelt (1867–1945) and Ellen Crosby Roosevelt (1868–1954).

Legacy
Roosevelt's house at the center of his Rosedale estate, is known today as the Isaac Roosevelt House and still stands on Riverview Circle in Hyde Park.  The home was listed on the National Register of Historic Places in 1993, along with a cottage and boathouse on the Hudson River nearby.

References

External links
 Isaac Roosevelt (My Family) website
 Isaac Roosevelt – families of royal people

Isaac
19th-century American businesspeople
People from Hyde Park, New York
American people of Dutch descent
1790 births
1863 deaths
Businesspeople from New York City